James Frederic Root (August 17, 1931 – May 26, 2003) was an American gridiron football player and coach.  He played professionally as a quarterback in the National Football League (NFL) for two seasons with the Chicago Cardinals (1953, 1956) and in the Canadian Football League (CFL) for one season with the Ottawa Rough Riders (1954).  Root served as the head football coach at the University of New Hampshire from 1968 to 1971 and at the College of William & Mary from 1972 to 1979, compiling a career college football record of 57–62–2 in 12 seasons.  Root was a native of Toledo, Ohio.  He played college football at Miami University under Woody Hayes and Ara Parseghian.  Root began his coaching career in 1958 as the backfield coach at Tulane University.  He moved to the University of Miami as backfield coach in 1960.  Root then coached for one season, in 1964, as offensive backfield coach at Dartmouth College, before moving to Yale University, where he served in the same capacity for three seasons.

Head coaching record

References

External links
 

1931 births
2003 deaths
American football quarterbacks
American players of Canadian football
Canadian football quarterbacks
Chicago Cardinals players
Dartmouth Big Green football coaches
Miami Hurricanes football coaches
Miami RedHawks football players
New Hampshire Wildcats football coaches
Ottawa Rough Riders players
Tulane Green Wave football coaches
William & Mary Tribe football coaches
Yale Bulldogs football coaches
Sportspeople from Toledo, Ohio
Coaches of American football from Ohio
Players of American football from Ohio